The Synagogue of Livorno is a historic synagogue in Livorno, Italy.

Tempio Maggiore (1603)

 

The first Synagogue of Livorno, called Tempio Maggiore, dates back to 1603. The synagogue was built in a modest and simple style by Claudio Cogorano and Alessandro Pieroni. In the following years the synagogue was enlarged to accommodate an increase of Livorno's Jewish population to approximately 3,000 people. The project to build a larger worship hall and to add galleries was undertaken by Francesco Cantagallina in 1642. The Torah ark was built with inlaid colored marble by Isidoro Baratta from Carrara, surmounted by a silver crown with a topaz set on it. The bimah was built with the same technique, and the ceiling was enriched with stuccoes, decorations and gilt.

The temple underwent structural renovation by Ignazio Fazzi following an earthquake in 1742. In addition, a second row of gallery was built for women. After the work was completed, the temple hall was the second largest after that of the Synagogue of Amsterdam, measuring 28 meters long by 26 meters wide. On September 20, 1789, the first evening of Rosh Hashanah 5550 according to the Hebrew calendar, the newly renovated synagogue was inaugurated. In the 19th century the synagogue was further expanded, and a new southern façade was built. 

The Synagogue of Livorno was partially destroyed during World War II.

Tempio Maggiore (1962)

The new Synagogue of Livorno is the main Jewish place of worship of the 700 Jews of Livorno who survived The Holocaust. The Temple is located in Piazza Elijah Benamozegh, not far from Piazza Grande, on the site of the ancient synagogue which was partially destroyed during World War II. It is one of the four synagogues built in the 1900s in Italy and is the only one erected after World War II. The synagogue was projected by the Italian architect Angelo Di Castro, the works began in 1958 and it was inaugurated on October 23, 1962.

The Temple is a modern, bold and original construction in reinforced concrete inspired by the tent in the desert in memory of The Exodus assigned to the guard of the Ark of the Covenant. At the centre of the synagogue is positioned the bimah, built with marbles recovered from the old destroyed synagogue; in front of it is the wooden Torah ark by Angelo Scoccianti, work dating from 1708 recuperated from the Synagogue of Pesaro. The Matroneum is placed on the back of the bimah at the first floor while in the superior part of the apse is a red stained glass in memory of the victims of The Holocaust. In the lower level is the Oratorio Lampronti where the bimah and the Torah ark come from the Temple of Spanish rite of Ferrara; the Oratory is used as synagogue in the winter time.

References

Synagogues in Italy
Buildings and structures in Livorno
Jews and Judaism in Livorno
Religious buildings and structures completed in 1603
Religious buildings and structures completed in 1789
Synagogues completed in 1962
1603 establishments in Italy
17th-century synagogues
Sephardi Jewish culture in Italy